William Lloyd Phillips (8 September 1881 – 22 April 1966) was a Welsh gymnast. He competed in the men's team all-around event at the 1900 Summer Olympics. He was the first Welshman to compete at the Olympics, and until July 2021, only his surname was known.

References

External links

1881 births
1966 deaths
Welsh male artistic gymnasts
Olympic gymnasts of Great Britain
Gymnasts at the 1900 Summer Olympics
Sportspeople from Newport, Wales
Welsh emigrants to the United States